A preanesthetic agent (or preanaesthetic agent) is a drug that is given before the administration of an anesthetic to make anaesthesia more pleasant and safe.

Examples

Examples of preanesthetic agents are:
Acepromazine
atropine
diazepam
Scopolamine
 Opioid analgesics, such as  morphine, pethidine and buprenorphine.

These drugs are used before the administration of an anesthetic to improve patient comfort, reduce possible side effects such as Postanesthetic shivering, relieve pain, and increase the effectiveness of the anesthetic.

See also 

 Premedication

References

Anesthesia